Mülheim (Ruhr) Hauptbahnhof is a railway station for the city of Mülheim in the German state of North Rhine-Westphalia. It was renamed as a Hauptbahnhof in 1974 at the time of the rebuilding of the Dortmund–Duisburg line as part of the establishment of the Rhine-Ruhr S-Bahn. It is classified by Deutsche Bahn as a category 3 station.

The original station is unusual in that it was built as two adjoining stations by the two main private railways buildings lines in the Ruhr area, the Rhenish Railway Company (Rheinische Eisenbahn-Gesellschaft, RhE) and the Bergisch-Märkische Railway Company (Bergisch-Märkische Eisenbahn Gesellschaft, BME).

History
The station was opened as Mülheim RhE as part of a section of the RhE's mainline through the Ruhr opened on 1 September 1866 between Osterath and Essen. Just to the north of the RhE's station, the BME opened its own station in 1867 as Mülheim-Eppinghofen BME on its own main line opened in 1862 between Dortmund and Duisburg. Although the two railways were nationalised in 1880 and 1882 the two stations were not linked.

On 1 June 1888, the station was renamed Mülheim (Ruhr), but on 11 August 1892 it was again renamed as Mülheim-Eppinghofen because another station (now called Mülheim (Ruhr) West) was then renamed as Mülheim (Ruhr), but it was never popularly accepted as the main station in Mülheim.  Between 1905 and 1910 a common station with a peaked roof was built to serve both lines, but it was destroyed during World War II and never rebuilt.  During the electrification of the Cologne-Hamm line in the 1950s the stopping place for long-distance trains was moved back to the Eppinghofen station and on 22 May 1955 it was renamed Mülheim (Ruhr) Stadt ("city"). In 1974 the station was relocated with the opening of Rhine-Ruhr S-Bahn and finally renamed Mülheim (Ruhr) Hbf.

Current situation
The current station consists of four tracks to the east and west located on the site of the BME station. The RhE lines have been closed and dismantled.

The following services currently call at Mülheim Hauptbahnhof:

Long-distance
A total of 13 long-distance trains per day stopped at the station in 2022.

Regional services

In local passenger service, Mülheim is served by several regional and S-Bahn lines:

Public transport 

An underground station for line U18 of the Essen Stadtbahn, line 102 of Mülheim/Oberhausen trams and line 901 of Duisburg trams lies adjacent to the former RhE station and is connected to the current station by a corridor.

In addition, the station is served by several bus lines.

References

External links

Railway stations in North Rhine-Westphalia
Rhine-Ruhr S-Bahn stations
Hauptbahnhof
S1 (Rhine-Ruhr S-Bahn)
S3 (Rhine-Ruhr S-Bahn)
Railway stations in Germany opened in 1866
1866 establishments in Prussia